Sinbyudaing (also spelt Hsinbyudaing or Sin Byu Daing), is a small village of Dawei District in the Taninthayi Region of Myanmar. It is located on the western side of the Tenasserim Range near the border with Thailand.

Infrastructure

Currently a road is being built to Dawei (Tavoy) from Bangkok that will improve communication with Myitta town to the northwest and the currently developed Htee Khee–Phu Nam Ron border pass to the southeast. Also a railway line is planned.

History
During the Japanese conquest of Burma, the forces of the Imperial Japanese Army began their invasion crossing the Tenasserim Hills through from Thailand reaching Sinbyudaing on 15 January 1942 and moving westwards to attack Myitta town. The three 6th Burma Rifles companies of the Tavoy garrison posted there were overrun by the Japanese troops.

References

External links
Gold panners on the upper Great Tenasserim (Tanintharyi) River, Sinbyudaing, Tanintharyi, Myanmar (Burma)

Populated places in Tanintharyi Region
Myanmar–Thailand border crossings